David B. Hulburt (December 8, 1829 – September 19, 1912) was an American educator and politician.

Born in Portland, Chautauqua County, New York, Hulburt went to public schools in Fredonia, New York and graduated from the normal department at Fredonia Academy (now State University of New York at Fredonia). Hulburt moved to Loganville, Sauk County, Wisconsin, in 1857. Hulburt was a farmer and surveyor. He was also a merchant. During the American Civil War, Hulburt served as an enrollment officer. He also served as county surveyor for Sauk County, justice of the peace, town superintendent of schools, and was postmaster of Loganville. In 1876, 1877, 1878, and 1905, Hulburt served in the Wisconsin State Assembly and was a Republican. Hulburt also served in the Wisconsin State Senate from 1885 to 1889. In 1907, Hulburt moved to Reedsburg, Wisconsin to live in retirement, and then to his daughter's house in Madison, Wisconsin where he died.

Notes

1829 births
1912 deaths
People from Chautauqua County, New York
People from Sauk County, Wisconsin
People of Wisconsin in the American Civil War
State University of New York at Fredonia alumni
Wisconsin postmasters
American surveyors
Farmers from Wisconsin
Republican Party members of the Wisconsin State Assembly
Republican Party Wisconsin state senators
19th-century American politicians
People from Reedsburg, Wisconsin